.sl is the Internet country code top-level domain (ccTLD) for Sierra Leone.

Request for use by Somaliland 
In 2020, the Minister of Telecommunication and Technology of the unrecognized state of Somaliland asked Sierra Leone's Ministry of Information and Communication if they would be willing to share the use of the ccTLD with Somaliland. It is not clear if any response was received.

Second-level domains 
 .sl: General (may be registered by anyone)
 .com.sl: Commercial entities, e.g. companies
 .net.sl: Commercial entities with relation to networking (such as ISPs, cable companies etc.)
 .org.sl: Charities and non-profit organisations
 .edu.sl: Educational institutions registered in Sierra Leone
 .gov.sl: State and local government entities (requires authorization letter from the local Minister of Information Office)

References

External links
 IANA .sl whois information
 Official .sl domain registration website

Country code top-level domains
Communications in Sierra Leone

sv:Toppdomän#S